Phan Hữu Dong (born 14 November 1938) is a Vietnamese former swimmer. He competed at the 1956 Summer Olympics, 1960 Summer Olympics and the 1964 Summer Olympics.

References

External links
 

1938 births
Living people
Vietnamese male swimmers
Olympic swimmers of Vietnam
Swimmers at the 1960 Summer Olympics
Swimmers at the 1964 Summer Olympics
People from Bến Tre Province
Southeast Asian Games medalists in swimming
Southeast Asian Games bronze medalists for Vietnam
Southeast Asian Games gold medalists for Vietnam
Competitors at the 1959 Southeast Asian Peninsular Games
Competitors at the 1961 Southeast Asian Peninsular Games
20th-century Vietnamese people
21st-century Vietnamese people